Mont Bichet, also known as Les Trables and, formerly, La Crêche, is a mostly wooded mountain in eastern France belonging to the Chablais Alps. Mont Bichet is the Haute-Savoie department and is surrounded by the three communes of the Brevon valley, Bellevaux, Lullin and Vailly. Its elevation is 1,360 m. Its slopes include many former Alpine pastures, now in ruins, covered by woodland and heavily populated with game animals.

Alpine pastures 
 Le Moan is a former alpine pasture located in the commune of Vailly, with an elevation of 1,050 m. It has been in disuse and wooded since the 1980s; its hillsides were used by the Maquis resistance fighters in World War II. A path leads from Le Moan to Sur les Monts.
 Le Plaine is another former pasture in Vailly, also used by the maquis. Disused and covered in woodland, it hosts a mill. It is accessible up to le Lavouet by taking the Sous la Joux road from the centre of the hamlet up to Granges Vulliez, passing on the left through the forest, then take the trail to le Plaine.
 Sur les Monts is a lieu-dit located in Bellevaux commune, at 1,126 m elevation.
 Les Granges de Lullin
 Le Gros Feu

Mountains of the Alps
Mountains of Haute-Savoie